John Galt (2 May 1779 – 11 April 1839) was a Scottish novelist, entrepreneur, and political and social commentator. Galt has been called the first political novelist in the English language, due to being the first novelist to deal with issues of the Industrial Revolution.

Galt was the first superintendent of the Canada Company (1826-1829). The company had been formed to populate a part of what is now Southern Ontario (then known as Upper Canada) in the first half of the 19th century; it was later called "the most important single attempt at settlement in Canadian history".

In 1829, Galt was recalled to Great Britain for mismanagement of the Canada Company (particularly incompetent bookkeeping), and was later jailed for failing to pay his son's tuition. Galt's Autobiography, published in London in 1833, includes a discussion of his life and work in Upper Canada.

He was the father of Sir Alexander Tilloch Galt of Montreal, Quebec.

Life
Born in Irvine, in Ayrshire, Galt was the son of a naval captain involved in the West Indies trade. He was a first cousin of Captain Alexander Allan. His father moved to Greenock in 1780. The family visited regularly but did not permanently rejoin him until 1789. John was educated at Irvine Grammar School alongside Henry Eckford, who was a lifetime friend, and William Spence.

Galt spent a few months with the Greenock Custom House, at age 17, then became an apprentice and junior clerk under his uncle, Mr. Ewing, also writing essays and stories for local journals in his spare time.  He moved to London in 1804 to join his father and seek his fortune. In 1809 he began studying law at Lincoln's Inn.

During a subsequent trip to Europe, where he was commissioned by a merchant firm to establish trade agreements, Galt met and befriended Lord Byron in Gibraltar. He traveled with Byron and his companion, John Hobhouse, 1st Baron Broughton to Malta. He met them again in Greece. Parting company, Galt continued alone to Constantinople, Adrianople and then Sophia. He returned to Greenock via Ireland. He then embarked to London to pursue business plans, but these did not come to fruition and he took to writing. Galt wrote an account of his travels, which met with moderate success. Decades later, he would also publish the first full biography of Lord Byron. He also published the first biography of the painter Benjamin West, The Life and Studies of Benjamin West (1816, expanded 1820).

In 1813, Galt attempted to establish a Gibraltarian trading company, in order to circumvent Napoleon's embargo on British trade; however, Wellington's victory in Spain made this no longer necessary. Galt then returned to London and married Elizabeth Tilloch, daughter of Alexander Tilloch. They had three boys. In 1815, he became Secretary of the Royal Caledonian Asylum in London. He also privately consulted in several business ventures.

Galt started to submit articles to Blackwood's Magazine in late 1819, and in March 1829 he sent Blackwood the publishers the plan for "The Ayrshire legatees".

Concentrating on his writing for the next several years, Galt lived at times in London, Glasgow, Edinburgh and elsewhere, writing fiction and a number of school texts under the pseudonym Reverend T. Clark. Around 1821 he moved his family from Greenock to Eskgrove near Musselburgh. In addition to moving his residence frequently during this period, Galt also switched publishers several times, moving from Blackwood's Magazine to Oliver and Boyd and then back again. In 1821 Annals of the parish was published as were two instalments of The steam boat and he started work on the novel Sir André Wylie. Annals of the parish established Galt's reputation overnight. Sir Andrew Wylie was published in 1822

In 1824, Galt was appointed Secretary of the Canada Company, a charter company established to aid in the colonization of the Huron Tract in Upper Canada along the eastern shore of Lake Huron.  After the company was incorporated by royal charter on August 19, 1826, Galt traveled across the Atlantic on the man-of-war HMS Romney, arriving at New York City and then traveling by road. Sadly, soon after arriving, word was sent that his mother had suffered a stroke. He returned to her (in Musselburgh) in 1826 and she died a few months later. He returned to Canada in 1826. While in Canada, Galt lived in York in Upper Canada (now Ontario), but located the headquarters of the Canada Company at Guelph, a town he also founded in 1827. Later that year, he co-founded the town of Goderich with Tiger Dunlop.  The community of Galt, Ontario was named after him.

His three sons played prominent roles in Canadian politics; one of them, Alexander, later became one of the 'Fathers of the Confederation', and Canada's first Minister of Finance.

During his tenure with the Canada Company, Galt ran afoul of several colonial authorities, including Sir Peregrine Maitland, who was Lieutenant-Governor of Upper Canada at the time.  He was heavily criticised by his employers for his lack of basic accounting skills and failure to carry out their established policies. This resulted in his dismissal and recall to Great Britain in 1829.

Soon after his return to Great Britain, he spent several months in King's Bench Prison for failure to pay debts. One of Galt's last novels, The Member, has political corruption as its central theme.

In 1831 he moved to Barn Cottage in Old Brompton.

Despite failing health (following a trip over a tree root whilst in Canada), Galt was involved in another colonial business venture, the British American Land Company, which was formed to develop lands in the Eastern Townships of Lower Canada (now Quebec). Galt served as secretary but was forced to resign in December 1832 because of his health. By this stage his spinal injury was not only crippling him but also affecting his speech and handwriting.

In 1834 he moved to Edinburgh following the publishing of his two-volume Autobiography in 1833. Galt here met the travel writer Harriet Pigott. Pigott persuaded Galt to edit her Records of Real Life in the Palace and the Cottage. She received some criticism for this as it was suspected that she was just taking advantage of Galt. However, her unfinished biography of him which is in the Bodleian Library implies that it was more of mutual respect than her critics allowed. Records of Real Life in the Palace and the Cottage had an introduction by Galt, and this three-volume work was published in 1839.

He retired to his old home in Greenock in August 1834 following the departure of three of his sons to Canada. Finding the accommodation unsuitable he lived temporarily in Gourock before returning to a more comfortable house in December 1834. Galt died on 11 April 1839. He was buried in the family tomb of his parents in the New Burying Ground in Greenock (now called the Inverkip Street Cemetery).

Huron Tract 
The company surveyed and subdivided this massive area, built roads, mills, and schools and advertised it at affordable prices to buyers in Europe. The company then assisted in the migration of new settlers, bringing them to the area by means of a boat, which the company also owned. Initially settling in York (Toronto, Ontario) he selected what later became Guelph, Ontario as the company's headquarters, and began to develop a town there. Galt is also considered to be the founder of Goderich, Ontario with his colleague William "Tiger" Dunlop.

Legacy

In Greenock, John Galt is commemorated by the John Galt memorial fountain on the Esplanade, and by a plaque at the old cemetery where he is buried. Sheltered housing (for seniors) built next to the cemetery in 1988, on the site of the old Greenock Royal Infirmary,  is named John Galt House in his honour.

He is also commemorated in Makars' Court, outside The Writers' Museum, Lawnmarket, Edinburgh, and in 2006, the community of Guelph proclaimed the first Monday in August, "John Galt Day".

The city of Galt, Ontario was named after John Galt, but was absorbed into Cambridge, Ontario in 1973. His original home in Guelph, known as the "Priory" (built 1827-1828), stood on the banks of the Speed River near the current River Run Centre for performing arts. The building later became the first CPR station in the city; the conversion was completed in 1888. The building was no longer required by the CPR which built a new station in 1910. A photograph from 1914 depicts it as boarded up. In spite of attempts by various individuals in Guelph to save the structure, it was torn down in 1926.

A historical plaque commemorates Galt's role with the Canada Company in populating the Huron Tract, calling it "the most important single attempt at settlement in Canadian history".

Works
Galt's novels are best known for their depiction of Scottish rural life, tinged with ironic humour.  Galt wrote the following works:
 Cursory Reflections on Political and Commercial Topics (1812)
 The Life and Administration of Cardinal Wolsey (1812)
 The Tragedies of Maddelen, Agamemnon, Lady Macbeth, Antonia and Clytemnestra (1812)
 Voyages and Travels (1812)
 Letters from the Levant (1813)
 The Mermaid (1814)
 The Life and Studies of Benjamin West (1816)
 The Majolo (2 volumes) (1816)
 The Appeal (1818)
 The Star of Destiny  (a three act play, 1818)
 The History of Gog and Magog: The Champions of London (children's book, 1819)
 The Wandering Jew (1820)
 The Earthquake (3 volumes) (1820)
 Glenfell (1820)
 The Life, Studies and Works of Benjamin West (1820)
 Annals of the Parish (1821)
 The Ayrshire Legatees (1821)
 Sir Andrew Wylie, of that Ilk (3 volumes) (1822)
 The Provost (1822)
 The Steam-Boat (1822)
 The Entail (3 volumes) (1823)
 The Gathering of the West (1823)
 Ringan Gilhaize (The Covenanters) (3 volumes) (1823)
 The Spaewife (3 volumes) (1823)
 The Bachelor's Wife (1824)
 Rothelan (3 volumes) (1824)
 The Omen (1825)
 The Last of the Lairds (1826)
 Lawrie Todd or The Settlers in the Woods (1830)
 The Life of Lord Byron (1830)
 Southennan (3 volumes) (1830)
The Book of  Life (1831)
The Black Ferry (variant of The Book of Life)
 Bogle Corbet or The Emigrants (3 volumes) (1831)
 The Lives of the Players (1831)
 The Member: An Autobiography (1832) – novel
 The Radical (1832) – novel, sequel to The Member
 Stanley Buxton (3 volumes) (1832)
 Autobiography (2 volumes) (1833)
 Eben Erskine or The Traveller (3 volumes) (1833)
 The Ouranoulagos or The Celestial Volume (1833)
 Poems (1833)
 The Stolen Child (1833)
 Stories of the Study (3 volumes) (1833)
 Literary Life and Miscellanies (3 volumes) (1834)
 A Contribution to the Greenock Calamity Fund (1834)
 Efforts by an Invalid (1835)
 The Demon of Destiny and Other Poems (1839)

References

Further reading
Carruthers, Gerard & Kidd, Colin (eds.) (2017), The International Companion to John Galt, Scottish Literature International, University of Glasgow, 
Gibault, Henri (1979), John Galt, romancier écossais, l'Université des langues et lettres de Grenoble,   

Scott, Paul Henderson (1985), John Galt, Scottish Academic Press, Edinburgh, 
Whatley, Christopher A. (ed.) (1979), John Galt 1779 - 1979, The Ramsay Head Press, Edinburgh,

External links

 The autobiography of John Galt, by Galt, John, 1779-1839, Published 1833
Biography at the Dictionary of Canadian Biography Online
 
 
 
 
 
 The University of Guelph Library provides page images and full text for many of Galt's works. The collection is available at https://web.archive.org/web/20060206051459/http://www2.lib.uoguelph.ca/resources/ebooks/galt_list/
 Wellington Guelph Community Portal
 : contains a 113-page 'Biographical Memoir' of John Galt's life.
Galt-Haldane family fonds, Archives of Ontario

1779 births
1839 deaths
People associated with Inverclyde
People from Irvine, North Ayrshire
Pre-Confederation Ontario people
Scottish expatriates in Canada
Scottish dramatists and playwrights
19th-century Scottish novelists
19th-century Canadian novelists
Scottish travel writers
Scottish people of the British Empire
Scottish biographers
Scottish short story writers
Scottish businesspeople
Scottish political writers
Canadian male novelists
Male biographers